Yoker is an area of Glasgow, Scotland, on the northern bank of the Clyde east of Clydebank,  west of the city centre.  From the fourteenth century, the Renfrew Ferry has linked Yoker with Renfrew on the south bank. Although shipbuilding has declined, the nearby Yarrows shipyard, now owned by BAE Systems, is still in operation.

The name is an Anglicisation of the Scottish Gaelic Eochair meaning a river bank.

Motor vehicles and tramcars were also manufactured in Yoker, which is now an operations centre for the North Clyde Line, part of Glasgow's suburban rail network. Yoker railway station has services on the Argyle and North Clyde lines.

The comedy series Limmy's Show featured a sketch in which perpetually-stoned Dee Dee Durie travelled to Yoker on a whim, finding the experience an exciting and terrifying adventure rather than a mundane bus journey.

References

External links
The Renfrew to Yoker Ferry
'From Heaven to Hell', study of Plean Street tower blocks at Disappearing Glasgow

Areas of Glasgow